The banjo is a stringed instrument with a thin membrane stretched over a frame or cavity to form a resonator. The membrane is typically circular, and usually made of plastic, or occasionally animal skin. Early forms of the instrument were fashioned by African Americans in the United States. The banjo is frequently associated with folk, bluegrass and country music, and has also been used in some rock, pop and hip-hop. Several rock bands, such as the Eagles, Led Zeppelin, and the Grateful Dead, have used the five-string banjo in some of their songs. Historically, the banjo occupied a central place in Black American traditional music and the folk culture of rural whites before entering the mainstream via the minstrel shows of the 19th century. Along with the fiddle, the banjo is a mainstay of American styles of music, such as bluegrass and old-time music. It is also very frequently used in Dixieland jazz, as well as in Caribbean genres like biguine, calypso and mento.

History

Early origins

The modern banjo derives from instruments that have been recorded to be in use in North America and the Caribbean since the 17th century by enslaved people taken from West and Central Africa. Their African-style instruments were crafted from split gourds with animal skins stretched across them. Strings, from gut or vegetable fibers, were attached to a wooden neck. Written references to the banjo in North America and the Caribbean appear in the 17th and 18th centuries.

The earliest written indication of an instrument akin to the banjo is in the 17th century: Richard Jobson (1621) in describing The Gambia, wrote about an instrument like the banjo, which he called a bandore.

The term banjo has several etymological claims, one being from the Mandinka language which gives the name of Banjul, capital of The Gambia. Another claim is a connection to the West African Akonting: The akonting is made with a long bamboo neck called a bangoe. The material for the neck, called ban julo in the Mandinka language, again gives Banjul. In this interpretation, Banjul became a sort of eponym for the Akonting as it crossed the Atlantic. The instrument's name might also derive from the Kimbundu word mbanza, which is a loan word to the Portuguese language resulting in the term banza. Its earliest recorded use was in 1678 in the Caribbean (Martinique) by enslaved Africans.

The OED claims that the term banjo comes from a dialectal pronunciation of Portuguese bandore or from an early anglicisation of Spanish bandurria. However, contrary evidence definitively supports that the terms bandore and bandurria were terms used when Europeans encountered the banjo or its kin varieties in use by people of African descent, who used different terms for the instrument like banza.

Various instruments in Africa, chief among them the kora, feature a skin head and gourd (or similar shell) body. Those African instruments differ from early African American banjos in that the necks do not possess a Western-style fingerboard and tuning pegs; instead they have stick necks, with strings attached to the neck with loops for tuning.

Another likely relative of the banjo is the akonting, a spike folk lute played by the Jola tribe of Senegambia, and the ubaw-akwala of the Igbo. Similar instruments include the xalam of Senegal and the ngoni of the Wassoulou region including parts of Mali, Guinea, and Ivory Coast, as well as a larger variation of the ngoni  known as the gimbri developed in Morocco by Black Sub-Saharan Africans (Gnawa or Haratin).

Banjo-like instruments seem to have been independently invented in several different places, since instruments similar to the banjo are known from a diverse array of distant countries. For example, the Chinese sanxian, the Japanese shamisen, Persian tar, and the Moroccan sintir, in addition to the many African instruments mentioned above.

Early, African-influenced banjos were built around a gourd body and a wooden stick neck. These instruments had varying numbers of strings, though often including some form of drone. The earliest known picture, of an enslaved person playing a banjo-like instrument (The Old Plantation) shows a four-string instrument with its fourth (thumb) string shorter than the others.

Banjos with fingerboards and tuning pegs are known from the Caribbean as early as the 17th century. Some 18th- and early 19th-century writers transcribed the name of these instruments variously as bangie, banza, bonjaw, banjer and banjar.

The instrument became increasingly available commercially from around the second quarter of the 19th century due to minstrel performances.

Minstrel era, 1830s–1870s

In the antebellum South, many enslaved Africans played the banjo, spreading it to the rest of the population. In his memoir With Sabre and Scalpel: The Autobiography of a Soldier and Surgeon, the Confederate veteran and surgeon John Allan Wyeth recalls learning to play the banjo as a child from an enslaved person on his family plantation. Another man who learned to play from African-Americans, probably in the 1820s, was Joel Walker Sweeney, a minstrel performer from Appomattox Court House, Virginia. Sweeney has been credited with adding a string to the four-string African-American banjo, and popularizing the five-string banjo. Although Robert McAlpin Williamson is the first documented white banjoist, in the 1830s Sweeney became the first white performer to play the banjo on stage. Sweeney's musical performances occurred at the beginning of the minstrel era, as banjos shifted away from being exclusively homemade folk instruments to instruments of a more modern style. Sweeney participated in this transition by encouraging drum maker William Boucher of Baltimore to make banjos commercially for him to sell.

According to Arthur Woodward in 1949, Sweeney replaced the gourd with a sound box made of wood and covered with skin, and added a short fifth string about 1831. However, modern scholar Gene Bluestein pointed out in 1964 that Sweeney may not have originated either the 5th string or sound box. This new banjo was at first tuned d'Gdf♯a, though by the 1890s, this had been transposed up to g'cgbd'. Banjos were introduced in Britain by Sweeney's group, the American Virginia Minstrels, in the 1840s, and became very popular in music halls.

The instrument grew in popularity during the 1840s after Sweeney began his traveling minstrel show. By the end of the 1840s the instrument had expanded from Caribbean possession to take root in places across America and across the Atlantic in England. It was estimated in 1866 that there were probably 10,000 banjos in New York City, up from only a handful in 1844. People were exposed to banjos not only at minstrel shows, but also medicine shows, Wild-West shows, variety shows, and traveling vaudeville shows. The banjo's popularity also was given a boost by the Civil War, as servicemen on both sides in the Army or Navy were exposed to the banjo played in minstrel shows and by other servicemen. A popular movement of aspiring banjoists began as early as 1861. The enthusiasm for the instrument was labeled a "banjo craze" or "banjo mania."

By the 1850s, aspiring banjo players had options to help them learn their instrument. There were more teachers teaching banjo basics in the 1850s than there had been in the 1840s. There were also instruction manuals and, for those who could read it, printed music in the manuals. The first book of notated music was The Complete Preceptor by Elias Howe, published under the pseudonym Gumbo Chaff, consisting mainly of Christy's Minstrels tunes. The first banjo method was the Briggs' Banjo instructor (1855) by Tom Briggs. Other methods included Howe's New American Banjo School (1857), and Phil Rice's Method for the Banjo, With or Without a Master (1858). These books taught the "stroke style" or "banjo style", similar to modern "frailing" or "clawhammer" styles.

By 1868, music for the banjo was available printed in a magazine, when J. K. Buckley wrote and arranged popular music for Buckley's Monthly Banjoist. Frank B. Converse also published his entire collection of compositions in The Complete Banjoist in 1868, which included "polkas, waltzes, marches, and clog hornpipes."

Opportunities to work included the minstrel companies and circuses present in the 1840s, but also floating theaters and variety theaters, forerunners of the variety show and vaudeville.

Classic era, 1880s-1910s
The term classic banjo is used today to talk about a bare-finger "guitar style" that was widely in use among banjo players of the late 19th to early 20th century. It is still used by banjoists today. The term also differentiates that style of playing from the fingerpicking bluegrass banjo styles, such as the Scruggs style and Keith style.

The Briggs Banjo Method, considered to be the first banjo method and which taught the stroke style of playing, also mentioned the existence of another way of playing, the guitar style. Alternatively known as "finger style", the new way of playing the banjo displaced the stroke method, until by 1870 it was the dominant style. Although mentioned by Briggs, it wasn't taught. The first banjo method to teach the technique was Frank B. Converse's New and Complete Method for the Banjo with or without a Master, published in 1865.

To play in guitar style, players use the thumb and two or three fingers on their right hand to pick the notes. Samuel Swaim Stewart summarized the style in 1888, saying,

The banjo, although popular, carried low-class associations from its role in blackface minstrel shows, medicine shows, tent shows, and variety shows or vaudeville. There was a push in the 19th century banjo to bring the instrument into "respectability." Musicians such as William A. Huntley made an effort to "elevate" the instrument or make it more "artistic," by "bringing it to a more sophisticated level of technique and repertoire based on European standards." Huntley may have been the first white performer to successfully make the transition from performing in blackface to being himself on stage, noted by the Boston Herald in November 1884. He was supported by another former blackface performer, Samuel Swaim Stewart, in his corporate magazine that popularized highly talented professionals.

As the "raucous" imitations of plantation life decreased in minstrelsy, the banjo became more acceptable as an instrument of fashionable society, even to be accepted into women's parlors. Part of that change was a switch from the stroke style to the guitar playing style. An 1888 newspaper said, "All the maidens and a good many of the women also strum the instrument, banjo classes abound on every side and banjo recitals are among the newest diversions of fashion...Youths and elderly men too have caught the fever...the star strummers among men are in demand at the smartest parties and have the choosing of the society of the most charming girls."

Some of those entertainers, such as Alfred A. Farland, specialized in classical music. However, musicians who wanted to entertain their audiences, and make a living, mixed it in with the popular music that audiences wanted. Farland's pupil Frederick J. Bacon was one of these. A former medicine show entertainer, Bacon performed classical music along with popular songs such as Massa's in de cold, cold ground, a Medley of Scotch Airs, a Medley of Southern Airs, and Thomas Glynn’s West Lawn Polka.

Banjo innovation which began in the minstrel age continued, with increased use of metal parts, exotic wood, raised metal frets and a tone-ring that improved the sound. Instruments were designed in a variety of sizes and pitch ranges, to play different parts in banjo orchestras. Examples on display in the museum include banjorines and piccolo banjos.

New styles of playing, a new look, instruments in a variety of pitch ranges to take the place of different sections in an orchestra – all helped to separate the instrument from the rough minstrel image of the previous 50–60 years. The instrument was modern now, a bright new thing, with polished metal sides.

Ragtime era (1895–1919) and Jazz Age era (1910s–1930s)

In the early 1900s, new banjos began to spread, four-string models, played with a plectrum rather than with the minstrel-banjo clawhammer stroke or the classic-banjo fingerpicking style. The new banjos were a result of changing musical tastes. New music spurred the creation of "evolutionary variations" of the banjo, from the five-string model current since the 1830s to newer four-string plectrum and tenor banjos.

The instruments became ornately decorated in the 1920s to be visually dynamic to a theater audience. The instruments were increasingly modified or made in a new style – necks that were shortened to handle the four steel (not fiber as before) strings, strings that were sounded with a pick instead of fingers, four strings instead of five and tuned differently. The changes reflected the nature of post-World War 1 music. The country was turning away from European classics, preferring the "upbeat and carefree feel" of jazz, and American soldiers returning from the war helped to drive this change.

The change in tastes toward dance music and the need for louder instruments began a few years before the war, however, with ragtime. That music encouraged musicians to alter their 5-string banjos to four, add the louder steel strings and use a pick or plectrum, all in an effort to be heard over the brass and reed instruments that were current in dance-halls. The four string plectrum and tenor banjos did not eliminate the five-string variety. They were products of their times and musical purposes—ragtime and jazz dance music and theater music.

The Great Depression is a visible line to mark the end of the Jazz Age. The economic downturn cut into the sales of both four- and five-stringed banjos, and by World War 2, banjos were in sharp decline, the market for them dead.

Modern era

In the post-World War Two years, the banjo experienced a resurgence, played by music stars such as Earl Scruggs (bluegrass), Bela Fleck (jazz, rock, world music), Gerry O'Connor (Celtic and Irish music), Perry Bechtel (jazz, big band), Pete Seeger (folk), and Otis Taylor (African-American roots, blues, jazz).

Pete Seeger "was a major force behind a new national interest in folk music." Learning to play a fingerstyle in the Appalachians from musicians who never stopped playing the banjo, he wrote the book, How To Play The Five-String Banjo, which was the only banjo method on the market for years. He was followed by a movement of folk musicians, such as Dave Guard of the Kingston Trio and Erik Darling of the Weavers and Tarriers.

Earl Scruggs was seen both as a legend and a "contemporary musical innovator" who gave his name to his style of playing, the Scruggs Style. Scruggs played the banjo "with heretofore unheard of speed and dexterity," using a picking technique for the 5-string banjo that he perfected from 2-finger and 3-finger picking techniques in rural North Carolina. His playing reached Americans through the Grand Ole Opry and into the living rooms of Americans who didn't listen to country or bluegrass music, through the theme music of   The Beverly Hillbillies.

For the last one hundred years, the tenor banjo has become an intrinsic part of the world of Irish traditional music. It is a relative newcomer to the genre.

The banjo has also been used more recently in the hardcore punk scene, most notably by Show Me the Body on their debut album, Body War.

Technique 

Two techniques closely associated with the five-string banjo are rolls and drones. Rolls are right hand accompanimental fingering patterns that consist of eight (eighth) notes that subdivide each measure. Drone notes are quick little notes [typically eighth notes], usually played on the 5th (short) string to fill in around the melody notes [typically eighth notes]. These techniques are both idiomatic to the banjo in all styles, and their sound is characteristic of bluegrass.

Historically, the banjo was played in the claw-hammer style by the Africans who brought their version of the banjo with them. Several other styles of play were developed from this. Clawhammer consists of downward striking of one or more of the four main strings with the index, middle or both fingers while the drone or fifth string is played with a 'lifting' (as opposed to downward pluck) motion of the thumb. The notes typically sounded by the thumb in this fashion are, usually, on the off beat. Melodies can be quite intricate adding techniques such as double thumbing and drop thumb. In old time Appalachian Mountain music, a style called two-finger up-pick is also used, and a three-finger version that Earl Scruggs developed into the "Scruggs" style picking was nationally aired in 1945 on the Grand Ole Opry. In this style the instrument is played by plucking individual notes. Modern fingerstyle is usually played using fingerpicks, though early players and some modern players play either with nails or with a technique known as on the flesh. In this style the strings are played directly with the fingers, rather than any pick or intermediary.

While five-string banjos are traditionally played with either fingerpicks or the fingers themselves, tenor banjos and plectrum banjos are played with a pick, either to strum full chords, or most commonly in Irish traditional music, play single-note melodies.

Modern forms 
The modern banjo comes in a variety of forms, including four- and five-string versions. A six-string version, tuned and played similarly to a guitar, has gained popularity. In almost all of its forms, banjo playing is characterized by a fast arpeggiated plucking, though many different playing styles exist.

The body, or "pot", of a modern banjo typically consists of a circular rim (generally made of wood, though metal was also common on older banjos) and a tensioned head, similar to a drum head. Traditionally, the head was made from animal skin, but today is often made of various synthetic materials. Most modern banjos also have a metal "tone ring" assembly that helps further clarify and project the sound, but many older banjos do not include a tone ring.

The banjo is usually tuned with friction tuning pegs or planetary gear tuners, rather than the worm gear machine head used on guitars. Frets have become standard since the late 19th century, though fretless banjos are still manufactured and played by those wishing to execute glissando, play quarter tones, or otherwise achieve the sound and feeling of early playing styles.

Modern banjos are typically strung with metal strings. Usually, the fourth string is wound with either steel or bronze-phosphor alloy. Some players may string their banjos with nylon or gut strings to achieve a more mellow, old-time tone.

Some banjos have a separate resonator plate on the back of the pot to project the sound forward and give the instrument more volume. This type of banjo is usually used in bluegrass music, though resonator banjos are played by players of all styles, and are also used in old-time, sometimes as a substitute for electric amplification when playing in large venues.

Open-back banjos generally have a mellower tone and weigh less than resonator banjos. They usually have a different setup than a resonator banjo, often with a higher string action.

Five-string banjo  
The modern five-string banjo is a variation on Sweeney's original design. The fifth string is usually the same gauge as the first, but starts from the fifth fret, three-quarters the length of the other strings. This lets the string be tuned to a higher open pitch than possible for the full-length strings. Because of the short fifth string, the five-string banjo uses a reentrant tuning – the string pitches do not proceed lowest to highest across the fingerboard. Instead, the fourth string is lowest, then third, second, first, and the fifth string is highest.

The short fifth string presents special problems for a capo. For small changes (going up or down one or two semitones, for example), retuning the fifth string simply is possible. Otherwise, various devices called "fifth-string capos" effectively shorten the vibrating part of the string. Many banjo players use model-railroad spikes or titanium spikes (usually installed at the seventh fret and sometimes at others), under which they hook the string to press it down on the fret.

Five-string banjo players use many tunings. (Tunings are given in left-to-right order, as viewed from the front of the instrument with the neck pointing up.) Probably the most common, particularly in bluegrass, is the Open-G tuning G4 D3 G3 B3 D4. In earlier times, the tuning G4 C3 G3 B3 D4 was commonly used instead, and this is still the preferred tuning for some types of folk music and for classic banjo. Other tunings found in old-time music include double C (G4 C3 G3 C4 D4), "sawmill" (G4 D3 G3 C4 D4) also called "mountain modal" and open D (F#4 D3 F#3 A3 D4). These tunings are often taken up a tone, either by tuning up or using a capo. For example, "double-D" tuning (A4 D3 A3 D4 E4) – commonly reached by tuning up from double C – is often played to accompany fiddle tunes in the key of D, and Open-A (A4 E3 A3 C#4 E4) is usually used for playing tunes in the key of A. Dozens of other banjo tunings are used, mostly in old-time music. These tunings are used to make playing specific tunes easier, usually fiddle tunes or groups of fiddle tunes.

The size of the five-string banjo is largely standardized, but smaller and larger sizes exist, including the long-neck or "Seeger neck" variation designed by Pete Seeger. Petite variations on the five-string banjo have been available since the 1890s. S.S. Stewart introduced the banjeaurine, tuned one fourth above a standard five-string. Piccolo banjos are smaller, and tuned one octave above a standard banjo. Between these sizes and standard lies the A-scale banjo, which is two frets shorter and usually tuned one full step above standard tunings. Many makers have produced banjos of other scale lengths, and with various innovations.

American old-time music typically uses the five-string, open-back banjo. It is played in a number of different styles, the most common being clawhammer or frailing, characterized by the use of a downward rather than upward stroke when striking the strings with a fingernail. Frailing techniques use the thumb to catch the fifth string for a drone after most strums or after each stroke ("double thumbing"), or to pick out additional melody notes in what is known as drop-thumb. Pete Seeger popularized a folk style by combining clawhammer with up picking, usually without the use of fingerpicks. Another common style of old-time banjo playing is fingerpicking banjo or classic banjo. This style is based upon parlor-style guitar.

Bluegrass music, which uses the five-string resonator banjo almost exclusively, is played in several common styles. These include Scruggs style, named after Earl Scruggs; melodic, or Keith style, named for Bill Keith; and three-finger style with single-string work, also called Reno style after Don Reno. In these styles, the emphasis is on arpeggiated figures played in a continuous eighth-note rhythm, known as rolls. All of these styles are typically played with fingerpicks.

The first five-string, electric, solid-body banjo was developed by Charles Wilburn (Buck) Trent, Harold "Shot" Jackson, and David Jackson in 1960.

The five-string banjo has been used in classical music since before the turn of the 20th century. Contemporary and modern works have been written or arranged for the instrument by Jerry Garcia, Buck Trent, Béla Fleck, Tony Trischka, Ralph Stanley, Steve Martin, George Crumb, Modest Mouse, Jo Kondo, Paul Elwood, Hans Werner Henze (notably in his Sixth Symphony), Daniel Mason of Hank Williams III's Damn Band, Beck, the Water Tower Bucket Boys, Todd Taylor, J.P. Pickens, Peggy Honeywell, Norfolk & Western, Putnam Smith, Iron & Wine, The Avett Brothers, The Well Pennies, Punch Brothers, Julian Koster, Sufjan Stevens, Sarah Jarosz and sisters Leah Song and Chloe Smith from Rising Appalachia

Frederick Delius wrote for a banjo in his opera Koanga.

Ernst Krenek includes two banjos in his Kleine Symphonie (Little Symphony).

Kurt Weill has a banjo in his opera The Rise and Fall of the City of Mahagonny.

Viktor Ullmann included a tenor banjo part in his Piano Concerto (op. 25).

Four-string banjos

The four-string plectrum banjo is a standard banjo without the short drone string. It usually has 22 frets on the neck and a scale length of 26 to 28 inches, and was originally tuned C3 G3 B3 D4. It can also be tuned like the top four strings of a guitar, which is known as "Chicago tuning". As the name suggests, it is usually played with a guitar-style pick (that is, a single one held between thumb and forefinger), unlike the five-string banjo, which is either played with a thumbpick and two fingerpicks, or with bare fingers. The plectrum banjo evolved out of the five-string banjo, to cater to styles of music involving strummed chords. The plectrum is also featured in many early jazz recordings and arrangements.

Four-string banjos can be used for chordal accompaniment (as in early jazz), for single-string melody playing (as in Irish traditional music), in "chord melody" style (a succession of chords in which the highest notes carry the melody), in tremolo style (both on chords and single strings), and a mixed technique called duo style that combines single-string tremolo and rhythm chords.

Four-string banjos are used from time to time in musical theater. Examples include: Hello, Dolly!, Mame, Chicago, Cabaret, Oklahoma!, Half a Sixpence, Annie, Barnum, The Threepenny Opera, Monty Python's Spamalot, and countless others. Joe Raposo had used it variably in the imaginative seven-piece orchestration for the long-running TV show Sesame Street, and has sometimes had it overdubbed with itself or an electric guitar. The banjo is still (albeit rarely) in use in the show's arrangement currently.

Tenor banjo

The shorter-necked, tenor banjo, with 17 ("short scale") or 19 frets, is also typically played with a plectrum. It became a popular instrument after about 1910. Early models used for melodic picking typically had 17 frets on the neck and a scale length of 19 to 21 inches. By the mid-1920s, when the instrument was used primarily for strummed chordal accompaniment, 19-fret necks with a scale length of 21 to 23 inches became standard. The usual tuning is the all-fifths tuning C3 G3 D4 A4, in which exactly seven semitones (a perfect fifth) occur between the open notes of consecutive strings; this is identical to the tuning of a viola. Other players (particularly in Irish traditional music) tune the banjo G2 D3 A3 E4 like an octave mandolin, which lets the banjoist duplicate fiddle and mandolin fingering. The popularization of this tuning is usually attributed to the late Barney McKenna, banjoist with The Dubliners. Fingerstyle on tenor banjo retuned to open G tuning dgd'g' or lower open D tuning Adad' (three finger picking, frailing) have been explored by Mirek Patek.

The tenor banjo was a common rhythm instrument in early 20th-century dance bands. Its volume and timbre suited early jazz (and jazz-influenced popular music styles) and could both compete with other instruments (such as brass instruments and saxophones) and be heard clearly on acoustic recordings. George Gershwin's Rhapsody in Blue, in Ferde Grofe's original jazz-orchestra arrangement, includes tenor banjo, with widely spaced chords not easily playable on plectrum banjo in its conventional tunings. With development of the archtop and electric guitar, the tenor banjo largely disappeared from jazz and popular music, though keeping its place in traditional "Dixieland" jazz.

Some 1920s Irish banjo players picked out the melodies of jigs, reels, and hornpipes on tenor banjos, decorating the tunes with snappy triplet ornaments. The most important Irish banjo player of this era was Mike Flanagan of the New York-based Flanagan Brothers, one of the most popular Irish-American groups of the day. Other pre-WWII Irish banjo players included Neil Nolan, who recorded with Dan Sullivan's Shamrock Band in Boston, and Jimmy McDade, who recorded with the Four Provinces Orchestra in Philadelphia. Meanwhile, in Ireland, the rise of ceili bands provided a new market for a loud instrument like the tenor banjo. Use of the tenor banjo in Irish music has increased greatly since the folk revival of the 1960s.

Six-string banjos

The six-string banjo began as a British innovation by William Temlett, one of England's earliest banjo makers. He opened a shop in London in 1846, and sold seven-string banjos which he marketed as "zither" banjos from his 1869 patent. A zither banjo usually has a closed back and sides with the drum body and skin tensioning system suspended inside the wooden rim, the neck and string tailpiece mounted on the outside of the rim, and the drone string led through a tube in the neck so that the tuning peg can be mounted on the head. They were often made by builders who used guitar tuners that came in banks of three, so five-stringed instruments had a redundant tuner; these banjos could be somewhat easily converted over to a six-string banjo.

American Alfred Davis Cammeyer (1862–1949), a young violinist turned concert banjo player, devised the six-string zither banjo around 1880. British opera diva Adelina Patti advised Cammeyer that the zither banjo might be popular with English audiences as it had been invented there, and Cammeyer went to London in 1888. With his virtuoso playing, he helped show that banjos could make more sophisticated music than normally played by blackface minstrels. He was soon performing for London society, where he met Sir Arthur Sullivan, who recommended that Cammeyer progress from arranging the music of others for banjo to composing his own music.

Modern six-string bluegrass banjos have been made. These add a bass string between the lowest string and the drone string on a five-string banjo, and are usually tuned G4 G2 D3 G3 B3 D4. Sonny Osborne played one of these instruments for several years. It was modified by luthier Rual Yarbrough from a Vega five-string model. A picture of Sonny with this banjo appears in Pete Wernick's Bluegrass Banjo method book.

Six-string banjos known as banjo guitars basically consist of a six-string guitar neck attached to a bluegrass or plectrum banjo body, which allows players who have learned the guitar to play a banjo sound without having to relearn fingerings. This was the instrument of the early jazz great Johnny St. Cyr, jazzmen Django Reinhardt, Danny Barker, Papa Charlie Jackson and Clancy Hayes, as well as the blues and gospel singer Reverend Gary Davis. Today, musicians as diverse as Keith Urban, Rod Stewart, Taj Mahal, Joe Satriani, David Hidalgo, Larry Lalonde and Doc Watson play the six-string guitar banjo. They have become increasingly popular since the mid-1990s.

Other banjos

Low banjos

In the late 19th and early 20th centuries, in vogue in plucked-string instrument ensembles – guitar orchestras, mandolin orchestras, banjo orchestras – was when the instrumentation was made to parallel that of the string section in symphony orchestras. Thus, "violin, viola, 'cello, bass" became "mandolin, mandola, mandocello, mandobass", or in the case of banjos, "banjolin, banjola, banjo cello, bass banjo". Because the range of pluck-stringed instrument generally is not as great as that of comparably sized bowed-string instruments, other instruments were often added to these plucked orchestras to extend the range of the ensemble upwards and downwards.

The banjo cello was normally tuned C2-G2-D3-A3, one octave below the tenor banjo like the cello and mandocello. A five-string cello banjo, set up like a bluegrass banjo (with the short fifth string), but tuned one octave lower, has been produced by the Goldtone company.

Bass banjos have been produced in both upright bass formats and with standard, horizontally carried banjo bodies. Contrabass banjos with either three or four strings have also been made; some of these had headstocks similar to those of bass violins. Tuning varies on these large instruments, with four-string models sometimes being tuned in 4ths like a bass violin (E1-A1-D2-G2) and sometimes in 5ths, like a four-string cello banjo, one octave lower (C1-G1-D2-A2).

Banjo hybrids and variants
A number of hybrid instruments exist, crossing the banjo with other stringed instruments. Most of these use the body of a banjo, often with a resonator, and the neck of the other instrument. Examples include the banjo mandolin (first patented in 1882) and the banjo ukulele, most famously played by the English comedian George Formby. These were especially popular in the early decades of the 20th century, and were probably a result of a desire either to allow players of other instruments to jump on the banjo bandwagon at the height of its popularity, or to get the natural amplification benefits of the banjo resonator in an age before electric amplification.

Conversely, the tenor and plectrum guitars use the respective banjo necks on guitar bodies. They arose in the early 20th century as a way for banjo players to double on guitar without having to relearn the instrument entirely.

Instruments that have a five-string banjo neck on a wooden body (for example, a guitar, bouzouki, or dobro body) have also been made, such as the banjola. A 20th-century Turkish instrument similar to the banjo is called the cümbüş, which combines a banjo-like resonator with a neck derived from an oud. At the end of the 20th century, a development of the five-string banjo was the BanSitar. This features a bone bridge, giving the instrument a sitar-like resonance.

The Brazilian Samba Banjo is basically a cavaquinho neck on a banjo body, thereby producing a louder sound than the cavaquinho. It is tuned the same as the top 4 strings of a 5-string banjo up an octave (or any cavaquinho tuning).

Notable banjoists

 Vess Ossman (1868–1923) was a leading five-string banjoist whose career spanned the late 19th and early 20th centuries. Vess started playing banjo at the age of 12. He was a popular recording artist, and in fact, one of the first recording artists ever, when audio recording first became commercially available. He formed various recording groups, his most popular being the Ossman-Dudley trio.
 Joel Sweeney (1810–1860) also known as Joe Sweeney, was a musician and early blackface minstrel performer. He is known for popularizing the playing of the banjo and has often been credited with advancing the physical development of the modern five-string banjo.
 Fred Van Eps (1878–1960) was a noted five-string player and banjo maker who learned to play from listening to cylinder recordings of Vess Ossman. He recorded for Edison's company, producing some of the earliest disk recordings, and also the earliest ragtime recordings in any medium other than player piano.
 Uncle Dave Macon (1870–1952) was a banjo player and comedian from Tennessee known for his "plug hat, gold teeth, chin whiskers, gates ajar collar and that million dollar Tennessee smile".
 Eddie Peabody (1902–1970) was a great proponent of the plectrum banjo who performed for nearly five decades (1920–1968) and left a considerable legacy of recordings. An early reviewer dubbed him "King of the Banjo", and his was a household name for decades. He went on to develop new instruments, produce records, and appear in movies.
 Frank Lawes (1894–1970), of the United Kingdom, developed a unique fingerstyle technique on the four-string plectrum instrument, and was a prolific composer of four-string banjo music, much of which is still performed and recorded today.
 Harry Reser (1896–1965), plectrum and tenor banjo, was regarded by some as the best tenor banjoist of the 1920s. He wrote a large number of works for tenor banjo, as well as instructional material, authoring numerous banjo method books, over a dozen other instrumental method books (for guitar; ukulele; mandolin; etc.), and was well known in the banjo community. Reser's accomplished single string and "chord melody" technique set a "high mark" that many subsequent tenor players endeavored – and still endeavor – to attain.
 Ola Belle Reed (1916–2002) was an American folk singer, songwriter and banjo player.
 Pete Seeger (1919–2014), a singer-songwriter who performed solo as well as with folk group The Weavers, included five-string banjo among his instruments. His 1948 method book How to Play the Five-String Banjo has been credited by thousands of banjoists, including prominent professionals, with sparking their interest in the instrument. He is also credited with inventing the long-neck banjo (also known as the "Seeger Banjo"), which adds three lower frets to the five-string banjo's neck, and tunes the four main strings down by a minor third, to facilitate playing in singing keys more comfortable for some folk guitarists.
 Earl Scruggs (1924–2012), whose career ranged from the end of World War II into the 21st century, is widely regarded as the father of the bluegrass style of banjo playing. The three-finger style of playing he developed while playing with Bill Monroe's band is known by his name: Scruggs Style.
 Ralph Stanley (1927–2016) had a long career, both with his brother as "The Stanley Brothers" and with his band "The Clinch Mountain Boys. He was awarded an honorary doctorate of music by Lincoln Memorial University, is a member of the Bluegrass Hall of Fame and the Grand Ole Opry. He won a Grammy Award for Best Male Country Vocal Performance in the movie O Brother, Where Art Thou?.
 Rual Yarbrough (1930–2010)
 Roy Clark (1933–2018)
 John Hartford (1937–2001)
 Ben Eldridge (b. 1938)
 Barney McKenna (1939–2012) was an Irish musician and a founding member of The Dubliners. He played the tenor banjo, violin, mandolin, and melodeon. He was most renowned as a banjo player. Barney used GDAE tuning on a 19-fret tenor banjo, an octave below fiddle/mandolin and, according to musician Mick Moloney, was single-handedly responsible for making the GDAE-tuned tenor banjo the standard banjo in Irish music. Due to his skill level on the banjo fans, all around the world and other members of The Dubliners nicknamed him "Banjo Barney".
 Bill Keith (1939–2015)
 Sonny Osborne (b. 1937)
 Pete Wernick (b. 1946)
 Tony Trischka (b. 1949)
 Béla Fleck (b. 1958) is widely acknowledged as one of the world's most innovative and technically proficient banjo players. His work spans many styles and genres, including jazz, bluegrass, classical, R&B, avant garde, and "world music", and he has produced a substantial discography and videography. He works extensively in both acoustic and electric media. Fleck has been nominated for Grammy Awards in more categories than any other artist, and has received 13 .
 Noam Pikelny (b. 1981) is an American banjoist who plays eclectic styles including traditional bluegrass, classical, rock, and jazz music. He has won the Steve Martin Prize for Excellence in Banjo and Bluegrass in 2010. He has been nominated for eight Grammy Nominations and has been awarded one with his band, The Punch Brothers, in 2018.
 Clifford Essex, (b. 1869 – c.1946) a British banjoist, who was also a musical instrument manufacturer
 Other important four-string performers were Mike Pingitore, who played tenor for the Paul Whiteman Orchestra through 1948, and Roy Smeck, early radio and recording pioneer, author of many instructional books, and whose influential performances on many fretted instruments earned him the nickname "Wizard of the Strings", during his active years (1922–1950). Prominent tenor players of more recent vintage include Narvin Kimball (d. 2006) (left-handed banjoist of Preservation Hall Jazz Band fame).
 Notable four-string players currently active include ragtime and dixieland stylists Charlie Tagawa (b. 1935) and Bill Lowrey (b. 1963). Jazz guitarist Howard Alden (b. 1958) began his career on tenor banjo and still plays it at traditional jazz events. Cynthia Sayer (b. 1962) is regarded as one of the top jazz plectrum banjoists. Rock and country performer Winston Marshall (b. 1988) plays banjo (among other instruments) for the British folk rock group Mumford and Sons, a band that won the 2013 Grammy Award for "Best Album of the Year".

See also 
 Akonting
 Banjo (samba)
 Banjo ukulele
 Benju
 Bulbul tarang
 Cuatro (instrument)
 Double-neck guitjo
 Stringed instrument tunings

References

Further reading

Banjo history 
 Conway, Cecelia (1995). African Banjo Echoes in Appalachia: A Study of Folk Traditions, University of Tennessee Press. Paper: ; cloth: . A study of the influence of African Americans on banjo playing throughout U.S. history.
 De Smaele G. (1983). "Banjo a cinq cordes". Brussels: Musée Instrumental (MIM), Brussels. D 1983-2170-1
 De Smaele G. (2015). "Banjo Attitudes." Paris: L'Harmattan, 2015.
 De Smaele G. (2019). "A Five-String Banjo Sourcebook." Paris: L'Harmattan, 2019.
 Dubois, Laurent (2016). The Banjo: America's African Instrument. Cambridge, MA: Harvard University Press, 2016.
 Epstein, Dena (1977). Sinful Tunes and Spirituals: Black Folk Music to the Civil War. University of Illinois Press, 2003. Winner of the Simkins Prize of the Southern Historical Association, 1979. Winner of the Chicago Folklore Prize. The anniversary edition of a classic study of black slave music in America.
 Gaddy, Kristina (2022). Well of Souls: Uncovering the Banjo's Hidden History. W. W. Norton & Company, 2022. . The author uncovers the banjo's key role in Black spirituality, ritual, and rebellion. 
 Gibson, George R. (2018). "Black Banjo, Fiddle and Dance in Kentucky and the Amalgamation of African American and Anglo-American Folk Music." Banjo Roots and Branches(Winans, 2018). University of Illinois Press, 2018. Gibson's historiographic chapter uncovers much new information about black banjo and fiddle players, and dance, in Kentucky, and their influence on white musicians, from the 1780s.
 Gura, Philip F. and James F. Bollman (1999). America's Instrument: The Banjo in the Nineteenth Century. The University of North Carolina Press. . The definitive history of the banjo, focusing on the instrument's development in the 1800s.
 Katonah Museum of Art (2003). The Birth of the Banjo. Katonah Museum of Art, Katonah, New York. .
 Linn, Karen (1994). That Half-Barbaric Twang: The Banjo in American Popular Culture. University of Illinois Press. . Scholarly cultural history of the banjo, focusing on how its image has evolved over the years.
 Tsumura, Akira (1984). Banjos: The Tsumura Collection. Kodansha International Ltd. . An illustrated history of the banjo featuring the world's premier collection.
 Webb, Robert Lloyd (1996). Ring the Banjar!. 2nd edition. Centerstream Publishing. . A short history of the banjo, with pictures from an exhibition at the MIT Museum.
 Winans, Robert (2018). Banjo Roots and Branches. University of Illinois Press, 2018. The story of the banjo's journey from Africa to the western hemisphere blends music, history, and a union of cultures. In Banjo Roots and Branches, Robert B. Winans presents cutting-edge scholarship that covers the instrument's West African origins and its adaptations and circulation in the Caribbean and United States.

External links

 
 The Banjo in Irish Traditional Music
 200 banjo makers pre 2nd WW
 BANJO ATTITUDES - Le banjo à cinq cordes : son histoire générale, sa documentation, Gérard De Smaele - livre, ebook, epub
 19th Century Banjo Instruction Manuals
 To Hear Your Banjo Play, 1947 Alan Lomax film (16 minutes)
 Fingerstyle Tenor Banjo
 Banjo Newsletter
 Banjo Hangout
 Online, Open-Source Banjo Chord Generator
 Dr Joan Dickerson, Sparky Rucker, and George Gibson with host Michael Johnathon explore the African-American History of the Banjo through conversation and music on show 350 of the WoodSongs Old-Time Radio Hour. Both audio and video are provided.
 "The Physics of Banjos – A Conversation with David Politzer", Ideas Roadshow, 2016

String instruments
Banjo family instruments
African-American music
Bluegrass music
Folk music instruments
American musical instruments
Celtic musical instruments
Irish musical instruments
Canadian musical instruments
Australian musical instruments
Guitars